The Fasht Dibal conflict was a conflict that arose between Qatar and Bahrain

In 1985, Bahrain began to construct several fortifications on the disputed island. Consequently, Qatar considered the construction to be a violation of an existing agreement made in 1978. In April 1986, Qatar occupied the island with a military force. On the island, there was an unspecified number of Bahraini officials, as well as 29 workers hired by Ballast Nedam, a Dutch company The army detained those on the island. Nearly a month later on 12 May 1986 Bahrain and Qatar reached an agreement following protests in the Gulf and the Netherlands.

The detained officials and hired workers were subsequently released, and Qatar withdrew from the island a month later on the 15th of June, 1986. After the 2001 ICJ case, Qatar obtained the island.

References

Bahrain–Qatar relations
Territorial disputes of Qatar
Territorial disputes of Bahrain